Thomas Dougan (22 November 1915 – 1980) was a Scottish footballer. His regular position was as a forward. He was born in Holytown. He played for Alloa Athletic, Tunbridge Wells Rangers, Plymouth Argyle, Heart of Midlothian, and made four appearances for Manchester United.

Dougan died in Lochore in 1980, at the age of 64.

References

External links
Profile at MUFCInfo.com

1915 births
1980 deaths
Scottish footballers
Manchester United F.C. players
Plymouth Argyle F.C. players
Heart of Midlothian F.C. players
Tunbridge Wells F.C. players
Association football forwards